The Fourteenth Council of Ministers of Bosnia and Herzegovina (Bosnian and) is the current Council of Ministers of Bosnia and Herzegovina cabinet formed on 25 January 2023, following the 2022 general election. It is led by Chairwoman of the Council of Ministers Borjana Krišto.

Investiture

History
Following the 2022 general election, a coalition led by the Alliance of Independent Social Democrats (SNSD), the Croatian Democratic Union (HDZ BiH) and the Social Democratic Party (SDP BiH) reached an agreement on the formation of a new government, designating Krišto as the new Chairwoman of the Council of Ministers. The Presidency officially nominated her as chairwoman-designate on 22 December.

The national House of Representatives confirmed Krišto's appointment on 28 December. On 25 January 2023, the House of Representatives confirmed the appointment of Krišto's cabinet.

Krišto's Cabinet is supported by the coalition of the SNSD, the HDZ BiH, the SDP BiH, the People and Justice party, Our Party, the Democratic People's Alliance and the Bosnian-Herzegovinian Greens. The major opposition is the coalition of the Party of Democratic Action and the Democratic Front. The coalition of the Serb Democratic Party and the Party of Democratic Progress is the major opposition in Republika Srpska.

Party breakdown
Party breakdown of cabinet ministers:

Cabinet members
The Cabinet is structured into the offices for the chairwoman of the Council of Ministers, the two vice chairs and 9 ministries.

Notes

References

External links
Website of the Council of Ministers

2023 establishments in Bosnia and Herzegovina
Cabinets established in 2023
Krišto